The term chi-square, chi-squared, or  has various uses in statistics:

chi-square distribution, a continuous probability distribution
chi-square test, name given to some tests using chi-square distribution
chi-square target models, a mathematical model used in radar cross-section